In corporate finance, a liquidity event is a transaction that enables the owners of a company to realize the value of their investment, such as a merger, acquisition or initial public offering. A liquidity event is a typical exit strategy for private investors, who otherwise have difficulty proving the company's value.

A liquidity event is not to be confused with the liquidation of a company, in which the company's business is discontinued.

References

External links
 COMPANY VALUATION AND LIQUIDITY EVENT: Don’t show up without them!
 Guiding your family through a liquidity event. Cashing out without melting down.
 Segway confuses investors with 'liquidity event' vow

Corporate finance
Strategic management
Entrepreneurship
Business terms